George Koumas (born 24 November 1962) is a Cyprus football administrator and member of FIFA council. In March 2018 he was elected president Cypriot Football federation.

Background 
Born in Paralimni, Cyprus. He studies business and hotel management and joined business were he did of sport tourism business and television license. He once serve as FC Enosis Neon Paralimini president in 2005, deputy secretary Cypriot Football Association and became deputy president of Cyprus Football Association, he was also executive committee member in UEFA till 2019 and member FIFA council in 2019.

References

External links

1962 births
Living people
FIFA officials
Members of the UEFA Executive Committee
People from Paralimni